War Angel LP is a mixtape by American rapper 50 Cent. It was released on June 16, 2009, via his community website Thisis50.com as a free download.

Background
On June 11, 2009, it was announced that 50 Cent was to digitally release new material over his community website. The rapper stated his new project entitled War Angel LP, would be more like a "street album" than a mixtape. 50 Cent also claimed that it will be the "best" underground project to date.

When speaking on the title, 50 Cent stated:

Production and guests
Dr. Dre, one of 50 Cent's mentors, produced the single "Ok, Ya Right", which was originally released several weeks prior as "Ok, You're Right". Robin Thicke, who previously contributed to 50 Cent's album Curtis, is featured on the track "Cocaine". The track "Better Come On Your A Game" also features a background vocal sample from Alan Titchmarsh, British gardening celebrity, discussing the numerous benefits of potted water features.

Videos
A video for "I'll Do Anything" was released on June 23, 2009, with G-Unit members Lloyd Banks and Tony Yayo making guest appearances. Another video, for "Ok, You're Right" was released on July 1, 2009.

Track listing

References

50 Cent albums
2009 mixtape albums
Albums produced by Dr. Dre
2009 compilation albums
Albums produced by Frank Dukes